St George was an electoral district of the Legislative Assembly in the Australian state of New South Wales, named after the St George district. It was originally created in 1894, when multi-member districts were abolished, and the four member Canterbury was largely divided between Ashfield, Burwood, Canterbury, Petersham and St George. In 1920, with the introduction of proportional representation, St George was expanded to a five-member district, absorbing the electoral districts of Canterbury and Hurstville. Proportional representation was abolished in 1927, and St George was divided into the single member electorates of St George, Canterbury, Hurstville, Oatley and Rockdale. St George was abolished in 1930, being partly replaced by Arncliffe.

Members for St George

Election results

References

Former electoral districts of New South Wales
Constituencies established in 1894
1894 establishments in Australia
Constituencies disestablished in 1930
1930 disestablishments in Australia